Special city refers to:

 Special cities of Korea (disambiguation), province-independent/province-level cities
 Special cities of Japan (since 2000), a city with a population of at least 200,000 that is delegated functions normally carried out by prefectural governments
 Special wards of Tokyo (since 1947), city-independent/city-level wards
 Special cities of China, now known as the municipalities of China

See also
 City with special status, the cities of Kyiv and Sevastopol, Ukraine